A glory is an optical phenomenon, resembling an iconic saint's halo around the shadow of the observer's head, caused by sunlight or (more rarely) moonlight interacting with the tiny water droplets that comprise mist or clouds. The glory consists of one or more concentric, successively dimmer rings, each of which is red on the outside and bluish towards the centre. Due to its appearance, the phenomenon is sometimes mistaken for a circular rainbow, but the latter has a much larger diameter and is caused by different physical processes.

Glories arise due to wave interference of light internally refracted within small droplets.

Appearance and observation 
Depending on circumstances (such as the uniformity of droplet size in the clouds), one or more of the glory's rings can be visible. The angular size of the inner and brightest ring is much smaller than that of a rainbow, about 5° to 20°, depending on the size of the droplets. In the right conditions, a glory and a rainbow can occur simultaneously.

Like a rainbow, a glory is centred on the antisolar (or, in case of the moon, antilunar) point, which coincides with the shadow of the observer's head. Since this point is by definition diametrically opposed to the sun's (or moon's) position in the sky, it always lies below the observer's horizon when the sun (or moon) is up. In order to see a glory, therefore, the clouds or fog causing it must be located below the observer, in a straight line with the Sun/Moon and the observer's eye. Hence, the glory is commonly observed from a high viewpoint such as a mountain, tall building or from an aircraft. In the latter case, if the plane is flying sufficiently low for its shadow to be visible on the clouds, the glory always surrounds it. This is sometimes called The Glory of the Pilot.

Brocken spectre 

When viewed from a mountain or tall building, glories are often seen in association with a Brocken spectre, also called Mountain spectre, the apparently enormously magnified shadow of an observer, cast (when the sun is low) on clouds below the mountain on which the viewer is standing. The name derives from the Brocken, the tallest peak of the Harz mountain range in Germany. Because the peak is above the cloud level and the area is frequently misty, conditions conducive to casting a shadow on a cloud layer are common.  Giant shadows that seemed to move by themselves due to movement of the cloud layer (this movement is another part of the definition of the Brocken spectre), and that were surrounded by glories, may have contributed to the reputation the Harz mountains hold as a refuge for witches and evil spirits.  In Goethe's Faust, the Brocken is called the Blocksberg and is the site of the Witches' Sabbath on Walpurgis Night.

Theory 

Modern theories of light, first described by Henri Poincaré in 1887, are able to explain the phenomenon of glories through the complex angular momentum (rotation) of the electromagnetic field of a light wave, and do not need quantum theories. A summary of rainbowlike phenomena was provided in Scientific American in 1977, and states: 

Most 20th century work on the phenomenon of rainbows and glories has focused on determining the correct intensity of light at each point in the phenomenon, which does require quantum theories. In 1947, the Dutch astronomer Hendrik van de Hulst suggested that surface waves are involved. He speculated that the brightness of the coloured rings of the glory are caused by two-ray interference between "short" and "long" path surface waves—which are generated by light rays entering the droplets at diametrically opposite points (both rays suffer one internal reflection). A theory by Brazilian physicist Herch Moysés Nussenzveig suggests that the light energy beamed back by a glory originates mostly from classical wave tunneling (synonymous in the paper to the evanescent wave coupling), which is an interaction between an evanescent light wave traveling along the surface of the drop and the waves inside the drop.

In culture 
C. T. R. Wilson saw a glory while working as a temporary observer at the Ben Nevis weather station. Inspired by the impressive sight, he decided to build a device for creating clouds in the laboratory, so that he could make a synthetic, small-scale glory.  His work led directly to the cloud chamber, a device for detecting ionizing radiation for which he and Arthur Compton received the Nobel Prize for Physics in 1927.

In China, the phenomenon is called Buddha's light (or halo). It is often observed on cloud-shrouded high mountains, such as Huangshan and Mount Emei. Records of the phenomenon at Mount Emei date back to A.D. 63. The colourful halo always surrounds the observer's own shadow, and thus was often taken to show the observer's personal enlightenment (associated with Buddha or divinity).

Stylized glories appear occasionally in Western heraldry. Two glories appear on the Great Seal of the United States: A glory breaking through clouds surrounding a cluster of 13 stars on the obverse, and a glory surrounding the Eye of Providence surmounting an unfinished pyramid on the reverse.

Gallery

See also 

 Antisolar point
 Aureola
 Brocken spectre
 Gegenschein 
 Halo (optical phenomenon) 
 Heiligenschein 
 Opposition surge
 Rainbow
 Subparhelic circle
 Sun dog
 Sylvanshine

References

Additional reading

External links 
 Video of a glory seen from an airplane archived at Ghostarchive.org on 4 May 2022
 Glories – Explanation and image gallery
 How are glories formed?
 First Observation of Glory From Space
 The Science of the Glory, Scientific American, Jan. 2012
 Glory and Brocken Spectre panorama

Atmospheric optical phenomena